The 2006 Auto Club 500 was the second race of the 2006 NASCAR Nextel Cup season. It was held on February 26, 2006 at Auto Club Speedway in Fontana, California.

Qualifying

Summary
Body styles and engines were the story of the second race of the Nextel Cup season.  Kurt Busch won the pole (187.086 mph) using a 2004 Dodge Intrepid-styled body, as opposed to the new Dodge Charger, which his Penske Racing team believed was aerodynamically superior.  Bobby Labonte and the #43 team ran the Intrepid as well.  Others, including Evernham Motorsports drivers Jeremy Mayfield and Kasey Kahne, drove the Charger.

On race day, Greg Biffle dominated, leading 168 of the first 218 laps.  Biffle won last year's spring race at California, finished second in the fall, and had won the Busch race the day before.  Tony Stewart was the fastest Chevy in the early going.  He overcame the car falling off the jack on a pit stop and an unscheduled stop for a flat tire to claw his way back among the leaders only to have an engine failure at lap 215, ending a string of 30 straight races without a DNF.  Biffle continued up front until lap 226.  He reported to the crew that his engine had lost a cylinder and a few laps later, he retired to the garage.  This left Matt Kenseth to take the lead and only a late-race caution kept him from pulling away.  Smoke and oil from the #4 car of Scott Wimmer brought out a yellow with three laps to go.  Kenseth easily held off Jimmie Johnson in the green-white-checker finish to earn his 11th career win.

Race results

Failed to qualify: Travis Kvapil (#32), Hermie Sadler (#00), Derrike Cope (#74), Randy LaJoie (#34), Morgan Shepherd (#89)

References

External links
 Official results

Auto Club 500
Auto Club 500
NASCAR races at Auto Club Speedway
February 2006 sports events in the United States